"Only in Dreams" is a song by the band Weezer. It is the 10th and final track on their 1994 self-titled debut album. At slightly under eight minutes, it is to date Weezer's longest song. It is most noteworthy for its three-minute crescendo of the two guitars, bass, and drums, in which the dynamics gradually increase and the timbre builds up layers until the climaxing guitar solo at the end.

Background
The song's lyrics tell the story of a young man who wants to be romantically involved with the girl of his dreams. But because he cannot do so in reality due to how nervous he is, he can only fantasize about being with her in his dreams; hence the title of the song. In a 2010 interview with Rolling Stone, Weezer frontman Rivers Cuomo said, "I think most of our audience always thought it was a song about a girl when I’m really singing about my artistic process."

Reception
When asked in 2006 which Weezer guitar solo he is the most proud of/likes the most, Rivers Cuomo answered, "I'd have to go with 'Only in Dreams' and [Make Believe track] 'Haunt You Every Day' for sheer length. Epic, epic, epic. So few people play these kinds of solos anymore."

IGN included "Only in Dreams" on their "Weezer Ultimate Mix" list, where they listed what songs they want to be compiled into a Weezer collection and called the song "the "Stairway to Heaven" for Generation X." They also listed the song on their "Top 10 Ambiguously Inspiring Songs" list, where they called it one of Weezer's best songs. Magnet considered "Only in Dreams" to be the third most overrated Weezer song. The song was rated #8 in Q Magazine's "20 Greatest Guitar Tracks" in September 2007. Melissa Bobbitt at About.com ranked it as the number 1 best Weezer song, stating "This is Weezer at their finest. From the syrupy opening bass line, to the sincere guitar work and the gawking lyrics, the immense closing song on their debut best represents the band".

In an article devoted to the song by Kevin McFarland at The A.V. Club, he described it as "Cuomo's epic masterpiece", as well as a "glorious anomaly in the Weezer canon".

Rolling Stone regarded the song as a "real gem." PopMatters calls the song a "'Bohemian Rhapsody'-worthy conclusion."

Live performances
"Only In Dreams" had typically been played at the end of a regular set (before the encore).  However this is not true for the Summer of 2002 Enlightenment tour, when the set lists were determined by the roll of a 20-sided die.
As of January 2022, the song has not been played live since 2015.

Covers
Ash has covered the song as a B-side of their 2001 single "Burn Baby Burn".

Mock Orange has covered the song on the album Rock Music: A Tribute to Weezer.

You Blew It! has covered the song for their Weezer cover album You Blue It.

Japanese artist Saku covered the song in her 2015 release Girls & Boys E.P.

Personnel
Rivers Cuomo – lead guitar, rhythm guitar, lead vocals
Matt Sharp – bass guitar, backing vocals
Brian Bell – vocals
Patrick Wilson – drums and other percussion
Ric Ocasek – producer

References

1990s ballads
1994 songs
Rock ballads
Song recordings produced by Ric Ocasek
Songs about loneliness
Songs written by Rivers Cuomo
Weezer songs